Rosner is a surname. Notable people with the surname include:

Arnold Rosner (1945–2013), American composer
Eddie Rosner (1910–1976), Polish jazz musician
Fred Rosner (21st century), American physician
Heinz Rosner (born 1939), former Grand Prix motorcycle road racer
Henry J. Rosner (1909–1982), American policy researcher
Mina Rosner (1913–1997), Canadian writer
Rick Rosner (born 1941), American television writer
Robert Rosner (21st century), American astrophysicist
Shmuel Rosner (21st century), Israeli journalist
Simon Rösner (21st century), German squash player

See also
117439 Rosner, a main-belt asteroid
Saidye Rosner Bronfman (1897-1995), namesake of the Saidye Bronfman Centre for the Arts
Rosener